James Carse may refer to:

James Alexander Carse (born 1958), Zimbabwean cricketer
James Howe Carse (c. 1819–1900), British Australian oil painter
James P. Carse, American religious writer